Abbasabad (also Romanized as ʿAbbāsābād) is a village in Mohammadabad Rural District, in the Central District of Anbarabad County, Kerman Province, Iran. At the 2006 census, its population was 37, in 5 families.

References 

Populated places in Anbarabad County